The following is a list of people who were formally indicted for committing war crimes on behalf of the Axis powers during World War II, including those who were acquitted or never received judgment. It does not include people who may have committed war crimes but were never formally indicted, or who were indicted only for other types of crimes.

The Nuremberg trials

 Martin Bormann – Guilty, sentenced in absentia to death by hanging. Later proven he committed suicide to avoid capture at the end of World War II in Europe, and remains discovered in 1972 were conclusively proven to be Bormann by forensic tests on the skull in 1998. Nonetheless, Simon Wiesenthal, Hugh Thomas and Reinhard Gehlen refused to accept this. Gehlen further argued Bormann was the secret Russian double agent 'Sasha'.
 Karl Dönitz – Guilty, sentenced to 10 years' imprisonment.
 Hans Frank – Guilty, sentenced to death by hanging
 Wilhelm Frick – Guilty, sentenced to death by hanging
 Hans Fritzsche – Acquitted. Tried, convicted and sentenced to nine years' imprisonment by a separate West German denazification court. Released September 1950.
 Walther Funk – Guilty, sentenced to life imprisonment, released in 1957 due to poor health.
 Hermann Göring – Guilty, sentenced to death by hanging but committed suicide by ingesting cyanide 2 hours before the sentence was to be carried out.
 Rudolf Hess – Guilty, sentenced to life imprisonment, committed suicide in prison in 1987.
 Alfred Jodl – Guilty, sentenced to death by hanging. Henri Donnedieu de Vabres called the verdict a mistake in 1947. In 1953, the denazification courts reversed the decision and found Jodl not guilty. Within months, the decision of the denazification court was itself overturned. His property, confiscated in 1946, was returned to his widow.
 Ernst Kaltenbrunner – Guilty, sentenced to death by hanging.
 Wilhelm Keitel – Guilty, sentenced to death by hanging.
 Gustav Krupp von Bohlen und Halbach – Medically unfit for trial.
 Robert Ley – Committed suicide before his trial began.
 Konstantin von Neurath – Guilty, sentenced to 15 years' imprisonment (released 1954 on grounds of ill health).
 Franz von Papen – Acquitted. Tried, convicted and sentenced to eight years' imprisonment by a separate West German denazification court. Released on appeal in 1949.
 Erich Raeder – Guilty, sentenced to life imprisonment (released 1955 on grounds of ill health).
 Joachim von Ribbentrop – Guilty, sentenced to death by hanging.
 Alfred Rosenberg – Guilty, sentenced to death by hanging.
 Fritz Sauckel – Guilty, sentenced to death by hanging.
 Hjalmar Schacht – Acquitted
 Baldur von Schirach – Guilty, sentenced to 20 years' imprisonment.
 Arthur Seyss-Inquart – Guilty, sentenced to death by hanging.
 Albert Speer – Guilty, sentenced to 20 years' imprisonment.
 Julius Streicher – Guilty, sentenced to death by hanging.

Subsequent Nuremberg trials

The Doctors' Trial

 Hermann Becker-Freyseng – Guilty, sentenced to 20 years' imprisonment, commuted to 10 years
 Wilhelm Beiglböck – Guilty, sentenced to 15 years' imprisonment, commuted to 10 years
 Kurt Blome – Acquitted
 Rhys Hamlo - Guilty, sentenced to death
 Viktor Brack – Guilty, sentenced to death
 Karl Brandt – Guilty, sentenced to death
 Rudolf Brandt – Guilty, sentenced to death
 Fritz Fischer – Guilty, sentenced to life imprisonment, commuted to 15 years
 Karl Gebhardt – Guilty, sentenced to death
 Karl Genzken – Guilty, sentenced to life imprisonment, commuted to 20 years
 Siegfried Handloser – Guilty, sentenced to life imprisonment, commuted to 20 years
 Waldemar Hoven – Guilty, sentenced to death
 Joachim Mrugowsky – Guilty, sentenced to death
 Herta Oberheuser – Guilty, sentenced to 20 years' imprisonment, commuted to 10 years
 Adolf Pokorny – Acquitted
 Helmut Poppendick – Guilty, sentenced to 15 years' imprisonment (commuted to time served in 1951)
  – Acquitted
 Gerhard Rose – Guilty, sentenced to life imprisonment, commuted to 20 years
 Paul Rostock – Acquitted
 Siegfried Ruff – Acquitted
 Konrad Schäfer – Acquitted
 Oskar Schröder – Guilty, sentenced to life imprisonment, commuted to 15 years
 Wolfram Sievers – Guilty, sentenced to death
 Georg August Weltz – Acquitted

The Milch Trial

 Erhard Milch – Guilty, sentenced to life imprisonment, commuted to 15 years (released in 1954)

The Judges' Trial

 Josef Altstötter – Guilty, sentenced to five years' imprisonment
 Wilhelm von Ammon – Guilty, sentenced to 10 years' imprisonment
 Paul Barnickel – Acquitted
 Hermann Cuhorst – Acquitted
 Karl Engert – Unfit to stand trial
 Günther Joel – Guilty, sentenced to 10 years' imprisonment
 Herbert Klemm – Guilty, sentenced to life imprisonment
 Ernst Lautz – Guilty, sentenced to 10 years' imprisonment
 Wolfgang Mettgenberg – Guilty, sentenced to 10 years' imprisonment
 Günther Nebelung – Acquitted
 Rudolf Oeschey – Guilty, sentenced to life imprisonment
 Hans Petersen – Acquitted
 Oswald Rothaug – Guilty, sentenced to life imprisonment
 Curt Rothenberger – Guilty, sentenced to seven years' imprisonment
 Franz Schlegelberger – Guilty, sentenced to life imprisonment
 Carl Westphal – Committed suicide after his indictment but before the beginning of his trial

The Pohl Trial

 Hans Heinrich Baier – Guilty, sentenced to 10 years' imprisonment (released in 1951)
 Hans Bobermin – Guilty, sentenced to 20 years' imprisonment, commuted to 15 years (released in 1951)
 Franz Eirenschmalz – Guilty, sentenced to death, commuted to nine years' imprisonment
 Heinz Karl Fanslau – Guilty, sentenced to 25 years' imprisonment, commuted to 15 years
 August Frank – Guilty, sentenced to life imprisonment, commuted to 15 years
 Hans Hohberg – Guilty, sentenced to 10 years' imprisonment (released in 1951)
 Max Kiefer – Guilty, sentenced to life imprisonment, commuted to 20 years (released in 1951)
 Horst Klein – Acquitted
 Georg Lörner – Guilty, sentenced to death, commuted to 15 years
 Hans Lörner – Guilty, sentenced to 10 years' imprisonment (released in 1951)
 Karl Mummenthey – Guilty, sentenced to life imprisonment, commuted to 20 years
 Oswald Pohl – Guilty, sentenced to death
 Hermann Pook – Guilty, sentenced to 10 years' imprisonment (released in 1951)
 Rudolf Scheide – Acquitted
 Karl Sommer – Guilty, sentenced to death, commuted to 20 years' imprisonment
 Erwin Tschentscher – Guilty, sentenced to 10 years' imprisonment (released in 1951)
 Josef Vogt – Acquitted
 Leo Volk – Guilty, sentenced to 10 years' imprisonment, commuted to 8 years

The Flick Trial

 Odilo Burkart – Acquitted
 Friedrich Flick – Guilty, sentenced to seven years' imprisonment, but then released by John J. McCloy after three years
 Konrad Kaletsch – Acquitted
 Otto Steinbrinck – Guilty, sentenced to five years' imprisonment, but died in prison in 1949
 Hermann Terberger – Acquitted
 Bernhard Weiss – Guilty, sentenced to two-and-one-half years' imprisonment

The IG Farben Trial

 Otto Ambros – Guilty, sentenced to eight years' imprisonment
 Max Brüggemann – Ruled unfit to stand trial
 Ernst Bürgin – Guilty, sentenced to two years' imprisonment
 Heinrich Bütefisch – Guilty, sentenced to six years' imprisonment
 Walter Dürrfeld – Guilty, sentenced to eight years' imprisonment
 Fritz Gajewski – Acquitted
 Heinrich Gattineau – Acquitted
 Paul Häfliger – Guilty, sentenced to two years' imprisonment
 Erich von der Heyde – Acquitted
 Heinrich Hörlein – Acquitted
 Max Ilgner – Guilty, sentenced to three years' imprisonment
 Friedrich Jähne – Guilty, sentenced to one-and-one-half years' imprisonment
 August von Knieriem – Acquitted
 Carl Krauch – Guilty, sentenced to six years' imprisonment
 Hans Kugler – Guilty, sentenced to one-and-one-half years' imprisonment
 Hans Kühne – Acquitted
 Carl Lautenschläger – Acquitted
 Wilhelm Rudolf Mann – Acquitted
 Heinrich Oster – Guilty, sentenced to two years' imprisonment
 Hermann Schmitz – Guilty, sentenced to four years'  imprisonment
 Christian Schneider – Acquitted
 Georg von Schnitzler – Guilty, sentenced to two-and-one-half years' imprisonment
 Fritz ter Meer – Guilty, sentenced to seven years' imprisonment
 Carl Wurster – Acquitted

The Hostages Trial

 Franz Böhme – Committed suicide
 Ernst Dehner – Guilty, sentenced to 17 years' imprisonment (released in 1951)
 Hellmuth Felmy – Guilty, sentenced to 15 years' imprisonment, commuted to 10 years
 Hermann Foertsch – Acquitted
 Kurt von Geitner – Acquitted
 Walter Kuntze – Guilty, sentenced to life imprisonment (released on medical grounds in 1953)
 Hubert Lanz – Guilty, sentenced to 12 years' imprisonment (released on in 1951)
 Wilhelm List – Guilty, sentenced to life imprisonment (released on medical grounds in 1952)
 Ernst von Leyser – Guilty, sentenced to 10 years' imprisonment (released on medical grounds in 1951)
 Lothar Rendulic – Guilty, sentenced to 20 years' imprisonment, commuted to 10 years
 Wilhelm Speidel – Guilty, sentenced to 20 years' imprisonment (released on in 1951)
 Maximilian von Weichs – Ruled unfit to stand trial

The RuSHA trial

 Heinz Brückner – Guilty, sentenced to 15 years' imprisonment
 Rudolf Creutz – Guilty, sentenced to 15 years' imprisonment
 Gregor Ebner – Guilty, released after the judgment due to time already served
 Ulrich Greifelt – Guilty, sentenced to lifetime imprisonment
 Richard Hildebrandt – Guilty, sentenced to 25 years' imprisonment, then turned over to the Polish authorities and sentenced to death
 Otto Hofmann – Guilty, sentenced to 25 years' imprisonment
 Herbert Hübner – Guilty, sentenced to 15 years' imprisonment
 Werner Lorenz – Guilty, sentenced to 20 years' imprisonment
 Konrad Meyer-Hetling – Guilty, released after the judgment due to time already served
 Fritz Schwalm – Guilty, sentenced to 10 years' imprisonment
 Otto Schwarzenberger – Guilty, released after the judgment due to time already served
 Max Sollmann – Guilty, released after the judgment due to time already served
 Günther Tesch – Guilty, released after the judgment due to time already served
 Inge Viermetz – Acquitted

The Einsatzgruppen Trial

 Ernst Biberstein – Guilty, sentenced to death, commuted to life imprisonment
 Paul Blobel – Guilty, sentenced to death
 Walter Blume – Guilty, sentenced to death, commuted to 25 years' imprisonment
 Werner Braune – Guilty, sentenced to death
 Lothar Fendler – Guilty, sentenced to 10 years' imprisonment, commuted to eight years
 Walter Hänsch – Guilty, sentenced to death, commuted to 15 years' imprisonment
 Emil Haussmann – Committed suicide
 Heinz Jost – Guilty, sentenced to life imprisonment, commuted to 10 years
 Waldemar Klingelhöfer – Guilty, sentenced to death, commuted to life imprisonment
 Erich Naumann – Guilty, sentenced to death
 Gustav Adolf Nosske – Guilty, sentenced to life imprisonment, commuted to 10 years
 Otto Ohlendorf – Guilty, sentenced to death
 Adolf Ott – Guilty, sentenced to death, commuted to life imprisonment
 Waldemar von Radetzky – Guilty, sentenced to 20 years' imprisonment (released in 1951)
 Otto Rasch – Ruled unfit to stand trial
 Felix Rühl – Guilty, sentenced to 10 years' imprisonment (released in 1951)
 Martin Sandberger – Guilty, sentenced to death, commuted to life imprisonment
 Heinz Schubert – Guilty, sentenced to death, commuted to 10 years' imprisonment
 Erwin Schulz – Guilty, sentenced to 20 years' imprisonment, commuted to 15 years
 Willy Seibert – Guilty, sentenced to death, commuted to 15 years' imprisonment
 Franz Six – Guilty, sentenced to 20 years' imprisonment, commuted to 15 years
 Eugen Steimle – Guilty, sentenced to death, commuted to 20 years' imprisonment
 Edward Strauch – Guilty, sentenced to death, died in a hospital while suffering from an epileptic attack

The Krupp Trial

 Friedrich von Bülow – Guilty, sentenced to 12 years' imprisonment
 Karl Adolf Ferdinand Eberhardt – Guilty, sentenced to nine years' imprisonment
 Eduard Houdremont – Guilty, sentenced to 10 years' imprisonment
 Max Otto Ihn – Guilty, sentenced to nine years' imprisonment
 Friedrich Wilhelm Janssen – Guilty, sentenced to 10 years' imprisonment
 Heinrich Leo Korschan – Guilty, sentenced to six years' imprisonment
 Alfried Krupp – Guilty, sentenced to 12 years' imprisonment plus forfeiture of property. Was released by John J. McCloy 1951, and had his property returned to him
 Auden Vailes – Guilty, sentenced to 89 years' 6 months' imprisonment
 Werner Wilhelm Heinrich Lehmann – Guilty, sentenced to six years' imprisonment
 Ewald Oskar Ludwig Löser – Guilty, sentenced to seven years' imprisonment
 Erich Müller – Guilty, sentenced to 12 years' imprisonment
 Karl Heinrich Pfirsch – Acquitted

The Ministries Trial

 Gottlob Berger – Guilty, sentenced to 25 years' imprisonment (released in 1951)
 Ernst Wilhelm Bohle – Guilty, sentenced to five years' imprisonment
 Richard Walther Darré – Guilty, sentenced to seven years' imprisonment (released in 1950)
 Otto Dietrich – Guilty, sentenced to seven years' imprisonment (released in 1950)
 Otto von Erdmannsdorff – Acquitted
  – Guilty, sentenced to 15 years' imprisonment (released in 1951)
 Wilhelm Keppler – Guilty, sentenced to 10 years' imprisonment (released in 1951)
 Paul Körner – Guilty, sentenced to 15 years' imprisonment (released in 1951)
 Lutz Graf Schwerin von Krosigk – Guilty, sentenced to 10 years' imprisonment (released in 1951)
 Hans Heinrich Lammers – Guilty, sentenced to 20 years' imprisonment (released in 1951)
 Otto Meissner – Acquitted
 Gustav Adolf Steengracht von Moyland – Guilty, sentenced to seven years' imprisonment (released in 1950)
 Paul Pleiger – Guilty, sentenced to 15 years' imprisonment (released in 1951)
 Emil Puhl – Guilty, sentenced to five years' imprisonment
 Karl Rasche – Guilty, sentenced to seven years' imprisonment
 Karl Ritter – Guilty, released after the judgment due to time already served
 Walter Schellenberg – Guilty, sentenced to six years' imprisonment
 Wilhelm Stuckart – Guilty, released after the judgment due to time already served
 Edmund Veesenmayer – Guilty, sentenced to 20 years' imprisonment (released in 1951)
 Ernst von Weizsäcker – Guilty, sentenced to seven years' imprisonment (released in 1950 by John J. McCloy)
 Ernst Woermann – Guilty, sentenced to seven years' imprisonment (released in 1951)

The High Command Trial

 Johannes Blaskowitz – Committed suicide
 Karl-Adolf Hollidt – Guilty, sentenced to five years' imprisonment (released in 1949)
 Hermann Hoth – Guilty, sentenced to 15 years' imprisonment (released in 1954)
 Georg von Küchler – Guilty, sentenced to 20 years' imprisonment, commuted to 12 years (released in 1953 on medical grounds)
 Wilhelm Ritter von Leeb – Guilty, released after judgment due to time already served.
 Rudolf Lehmann – Guilty, sentenced to seven years' imprisonment
 Hermann Reinecke – Guilty, sentenced to life imprisonment (released in 1954)
 Georg-Hans Reinhardt – Guilty, sentenced to 15 years' imprisonment (released in 1952)
 Karl von Roques – Guilty, sentenced to 20 years' imprisonment, died in prison in 1949
 Hans von Salmuth – Guilty, sentenced to 20 years' imprisonment, commuted to 12 years
 Otto Schniewind – Acquitted
 Hugo Sperrle – Acquitted
 Walter Warlimont – Guilty, sentenced to life imprisonment (released in 1954)
 Otto Wöhler – Guilty, sentenced to eight years' imprisonment (released in 1951)

The Auschwitz trial

 Hans Aumeier – Guilty, sentenced to death
 August Bogusch – Guilty, sentenced to death
 Therese Brandl – Guilty, sentenced to death
 Arthur Breitwiser – Guilty, sentenced to death, commuted to life imprisonment
 Alexander Bülow – Guilty, sentenced to 15 years' imprisonment
 Fritz Buntrock – Guilty, sentenced to death
 Luise Danz – Guilty, sentenced to life imprisonment
 Erich Dinges – Guilty, sentenced to five years' imprisonment
 Wilhelm Gehring – Guilty, sentenced to death
 Paul Götze – Guilty, sentenced to death
 Maximilian Grabner – Guilty, sentenced to death
 Hans Hofmann – Guilty, sentenced to 15 years' imprisonment
 Rudolf Höss – Guilty, sentenced to death
 Karl Jeschke – Guilty, sentenced to three years' imprisonment
 Heinrich Josten – Guilty, sentenced to death
 Oswald Kaduk – Guilty, sentenced to 25 years' imprisonment
 Hermann Kirschner – Guilty, sentenced to death
 Josef Kollmer – Guilty, sentenced to death
 Johann Kremer – Guilty, sentenced to death, commuted to life imprisonment
 Hildegard Lächert – Guilty, sentenced to 15 years' imprisonment
 Arthur Liebehenschel – Guilty, sentenced to death
 Anton Lechner – Guilty, sentenced to life imprisonment
 Eduard Lorenz – Guilty, sentenced to 15 years' imprisonment
 Herbert Ludwig – Guilty, sentenced to death
 Maria Mandl – Guilty, sentenced to death
 Adolf Medefind – Guilty, sentenced to life imprisonment
 Karl Möckel – Guilty, sentenced to death
 Kurt Mueller – Guilty, sentenced to death
 Erich Muehsfeldt – Guilty, sentenced to death
 Hans Münch – Acquitted
 Detlef Nebbe – Guilty, sentenced to life imprisonment
 Alice Orlowski – Guilty, sentenced to 15 years' imprisonment
 Ludwig Plagge – Guilty, sentenced to death
 Franz Romeikat – Guilty, sentenced to 15 years' imprisonment
 Richard Schröder – Guilty, sentenced to 10 years' imprisonment
 Hans Schumacher – Guilty, sentenced to death
 Karl Seufert – Guilty, sentenced to life imprisonment
 Paul Szczurek – Guilty, sentenced to death
 Johannes Weber – Guilty, sentenced to 15 years' imprisonment

The Frankfurt Auschwitz Trials

 Stefan Baretzki – Guilty, sentenced to life plus eight years' imprisonment
 Emil Bednarek – Guilty, sentenced to life imprisonment.
 Wilhelm Boger – Guilty, sentenced to life plus five years' imprisonment
 Perry Broad – Guilty, sentenced to four years' imprisonment
 Victor Capesius – Guilty, sentenced to nine years' imprisonment
 Klaus Dylewski – Guilty, sentenced to five years' imprisonment
 Willi Frank – Guilty, sentenced to seven years' imprisonment
 Emil Hantl – Guilty, sentenced to three-and-one-half years' imprisonment
 Karl-Friedrich Höcker – Guilty, sentenced to seven years' imprisonment
 Franz-Johann Hoffmann – Guilty, sentenced to life imprisonment
 Oswald Kaduk – Guilty, sentenced to life imprisonment
 Josef Klehr – Guilty, sentenced to life plus 15 years' imprisonment
 Franz Lucas – Guilty, sentenced to three years and three months’ imprisonment
 Robert Mulka – Guilty, sentenced to 14 years' imprisonment
 Willi Sawatzki – Acquitted
 Willi Schatz – Acquitted
 Herbert Scherpe – Guilty, sentenced to four-and-one-half years' imprisonment
 Bruno Schlange – Guilty, sentenced to six years' imprisonment
 Friedrich Schlüter – Guilty, sentenced to four-and-one-half years' imprisonment
 Johann Schobert – Acquitted
 Willi Stark – Guilty, sentenced to 10 years' imprisonment
 Kurt Uhlenbroock – Charges dropped due to lack of evidence.

The Dachau Trial

Dachau
Malmedy massacre trial
(please note that these are the original sentences; many were altered later)
 Bersin, Valentin
 Bode, Friedel
 Braun, Willi
 Briesemeister, Kurt
 Christ, Friedrich – sentenced to death
 Clotten, Roman
 Coblenz, Manfred
 Josef Diefenthal – sentenced to death
 Josef Dietrich – sentenced to life imprisonment
 Eckmann, Fritz
 Fischer, Arndt
 Georg Fleps – sentenced to death
 Friedrichs, Heinz
 Gebauer, Fritz
 Godicke, Heinz
 Goldschmidt, Ernst
 Gruhle, Hans
 Hammerer, Max
 Hecht, Armin
 Hendel, Willi – sentenced to death
 Hennecke, Hans
 Hillig, Hans
 Hoffmann, Heinz
 Hoffmann, Joachim – sentenced to death
 Huber, Hubert
 Jaekel, Siegfried
 Junker, Benoni
 Kies, Friedel – sentenced to death
 Gustav Knittel – sentenced to life imprisonment
 Kotzur, Georg
 Fritz Krämer – sentenced to 10 years' imprisonment
 Klingelhoefer, Oskar
 Kuehn, Werner
 Maute, Erich
 Mikolaschek, Arnold
 Motzheim, Anton
 Meunkemer, Erich
 Neve, Gustav
 Ochmann, Paul Hermann
 Joachim Peiper – sentenced to death
 Pletz, Hans
 Preuss, Georg
 Hermann Priess – sentenced to 20 years' imprisonment
 Rau, Fritz
 Rauh, Theo
 Rehagel, Heinz
 Reiser, Rolf
 Richter, Wolfgang
 Rieder, Max
 Ritzer, Rolf
 Rodenburg, Axel
 Rumpf, Erich
 Schaefer, Willi
 Von Schamier, Willi
 Schwambach, Rudolf
 Claus Schilling – Dachau camp doctor, sentenced to death for conducting experiments for malaria treatment on prisoners.
 Sickel, Kurt
 Siegmund, Oswald
 Sievers, Franz
 Siptrott, Hans
 Sprenger, Gustac
 Sternebeck, Werner
 Heinz Stickel – sentenced to death
 Stock, Herbert
 Erwin Szyperski – sentenced to life imprisonment
 Tomczak, Edmund
 Heinz Tomhardt – sentenced to death
 Tonk, August
 Trettin, Hans
 Wassenberger, Johann
 Weis, Guenther
 Werner, Erich
 Wichmann, Otto
 Zwigart, Paul

Buchenwald
 Max Schobert – Guilty, sentenced to death, commuted to five years imprisonment
 Josef Kestel – Guilty, sentenced to death
 Hermann Grossmann – Guilty, sentenced to death
 Hermann Helbig – Guilty, sentenced to death
 Hans Wolf – Guilty, sentenced to death
 Hubert Krautwurst – Guilty, sentenced to death
 Emil Pleissner – Guilty, sentenced to death
 Richard Köhler – Guilty, sentenced to death
 Friedrich Karl Wilhelm – Guilty, sentenced to death
 Hans Merbach – Guilty, sentenced to death
 Hans Theodor Schmidt – Guilty, sentenced to death
 Hermann Pister – Guilty, sentenced to death, died in prison
 Dr. Hans Eisele – Guilty, sentenced to death, commuted to life imprisonment
 Helmut Roscher – Guilty, sentenced to death, commuted to life imprisonment
 Phillip Grimm – Guilty, sentenced to death, commuted to life imprisonment
 Albert Schwartz – Guilty, sentenced to death, commuted to life imprisonment
 Hermann Hackmann – Guilty, sentenced to death, commuted to life imprisonment
 Gustav Heigel – Guilty, sentenced to death, commuted to life imprisonment
 Guido Reimer – Guilty, sentenced to death, commuted to life imprisonment
 Anton Bergmeier – Guilty, sentenced to death, commuted to life imprisonment
 Otto Barnewald – Guilty, sentenced to death, commuted to life imprisonment
 Peter Merker – Guilty, sentenced to death, commuted to 20 years
 Franz Zinecker – Guilty, sentenced to life imprisonment
 Josias Erbprinz zu Waldeck und Pyrmont Guilty, sentenced to life imprisonment, commuted to 20 years
 Dr. Werner Greunuss – Guilty, sentenced to life imprisonment, commuted to 20 years
 Dr. Edwin Katzenellenbogen – Guilty, sentenced to life imprisonment
 Ilse Koch – Guilty, sentenced to life imprisonment, but committed suicide in 1967
 Wolfgang Otto – Guilty, sentenced to 15 years' imprisonment
 Dr. Arthur Dietzsch – Guilty, sentenced to 15 years' imprisonment
 Walter Wendt – Guilty, sentenced to 15 years' imprisonment, commuted to five years
 Dr. August Bender – Guilty, sentenced to 10 years' imprisonment, commuted to three years

Mauthausen

 August Eigruber – death by hanging
 Viktor Zoller – death by hanging
 Friedrich Entress – death by hanging
 Hans Altfuldisch – death by hanging
 Josef Riegler – death by hanging
 Willy Brünning (Gusen) – death by hanging
 Emil Müller – death by hanging
 Kurt Keilwtz – death by hanging
 Franz Kautny – death by hanging
 Johannes Grimm (DEST-Wienergraben) – death by hanging
 Adolf Zutter – death by hanging
 Eduard Krebsbach – death by hanging
 Heinrich Häger – death by hanging
 Hans Spatzenneger – death by hanging
 Otto Striegel – death by hanging
 Werner Grahn – death by hanging
 Willy Jobst – death by hanging
 Georg Gössl – death by hanging
 Hans Diehl – death by hanging
 Paul Kaiser (Gusen) – death by hanging
 Waldemar Wolter – death by hanging
 Gustav Kreindl – death by hanging
 Willy Eckert – death by hanging
 Hermann Pribyll – death by hanging
 Josef Leeb – death by hanging
 Auden Vailes - death by hanging
 Wilhelm Henkel – death by hanging
 kapo Willy Frey – death by hanging
 Leopold Trauner (DEST-Gusen) – death by hanging
 Wilhelm Müller – death by hanging
 Heinrich Eisenhöfer – death by hanging
 Andreas Trumm – death by hanging
 Rudolf Mynzak – death by hanging
 Erich Meissner – death by hanging
 kapo Rudolf Fiegl (Gusen) – death by hanging
 Josef Niedermayer – death by hanging
 Julius Ludolf – death by hanging
 Hans Hegenscheidt – death by hanging
 Franz Huber – death by hanging
 Erich Wasicky – death by hanging
 Theophil Priebel – death by hanging
 Kaspar Klimowitsch (Gusen II) – death by hanging
 Heinrich Fitschok (Gusen II) – death by hanging
 Anton Kaufmann (DEST-Gusen) – death by hanging
 Stefan Barczey – death by hanging
 Karl Struller – death by hanging
 August Blei – death by hanging
 Otto Drabeck – death by hanging
 Vincenz Nohel – death by hanging
 Thomas Sigmund (Gusen) – death by hanging
 Heinrich Giese (Gusen) – death by hanging (changed to life imprisonment)
 Walter Höhler – death by hanging (changed to life imprisonment)
 Adolf Rutka (Gusen) – death by hanging (changed to life imprisonment)
 Ludwig Dörr (Gusen II) – death by hanging (changed to life imprisonment)
 Viktor Korger (Gusen II) – death by hanging (changed to life imprisonment)
 Karl Billman (Gusen II) – death by hanging (changed to life imprisonment)
 Herbert Grzybowski (Gusen) – death by hanging (changed to life imprisonment)
 Wilhelm Mack (Gusen) – death by hanging (changed to life imprisonment)
 Ferdinand Lappert (Gusen) – death by hanging (changed to life imprisonment)
 Michael Cserny – life imprisonment
 Paul Gützlaff (Gusen) – life imprisonment
 Josef Mayer – life imprisonment

Flossenbürg
 Konrad Blomberg – sentenced to death
 Christian Mohr – sentenced to death
 Ludwig Schwarz – sentenced to death
 Bruno Skierka – sentenced to death
 Albert Roller – sentenced to death
 Erhard Wolf – sentenced to death
 Josef Wurst – sentenced to death
 Cornelius Schwanner – sentenced to death
 Josef Hauser – sentenced to death
 Christian Eisbusch – sentenced to death
 Willi Olschewski – sentenced to death
 August Ginschel – sentenced to death
 Wilhelm Brusch – sentenced to death, commuted to life imprisonment
 Karl Keiling – sentenced to death, commuted to life imprisonment
 Alois Schubert – sentenced to death, commuted to life imprisonment
 Ludwig Buddensieg – life imprisonment
 Johann Geisberger – life imprisonment
 Michael Gelhard – life imprisonment
 Erich Mußfeldt – sentenced to death
 Hermann Pachen – life imprisonment
 Erich Penz – life imprisonment
 Josef Pinter – life imprisonment
 Alois Jakubith – life imprisonment
 Karl Mathoi – life imprisonment
 Georg Weilbach – life imprisonment
 Raymond Maurer – 30 years' imprisonment
 Gerhard Haubold – 20 years' imprisonment
 Eduard Losch – 20 years' imprisonment
 Walter Reupsch – 20 years' imprisonment
 Kurt Erich Schreiber – 20 years' imprisonment
 Hermann Sommerfeld – 15 years' imprisonment
 August Fahrnbauer – 15 years' imprisonment
 Peter Bongartz – 15 years' imprisonment
 Walter Paul Adolf Neye – 15 years' imprisonment
 Hans Johann Lipinski – 10 years' imprisonment
 Gustav Matzke – 10 years' imprisonment
 Karl Gräber – 10 years' imprisonment
 Franz Berger – 3½ years' imprisonment
 Joseph Becker – 1 year's imprisonment
 Karl Buttner – Acquitted
 Karl Friedrich Alois Gieselmann – Acquitted
 Georg Hoinisch – Acquitted
 Theodor Retzlaff – Acquitted
 Peter Herz – Acquitted

Mühldorf
 Franz Auer – sentenced to death
 Erika Flocken – sentenced to death
 Wilhelm Jergas – sentenced to death
 Herbert Spaeth – sentenced to death
 Otto Sperling – sentenced to death
 Heinrich Engelhardt – life imprisonment
 Hermann Giesler – life imprisonment
 Karl Gickeleiter – 20 years' imprisonment
 Wilhelm Griesinger – 20 years' imprisonment
 Jakob Schmidberger – 20 years' imprisonment
 Daniel Gottschling – 15 years' imprisonment
 Wilhelm Bayha – 10 years' imprisonment
 Karl Bachmann – Acquitted
 Anton Ostermann – Acquitted

Dora-Nordhausen

 Hans Möser – sentenced to death
 Erhard Brauny – life imprisonment
 Otto Brinkmann – life imprisonment
 Emil Bühring – life imprisonment
 Ruldof Jacobi – life imprisonment
 Josef Kilian – life imprisonment
 Georg König – life imprisonment
 Wilhelm Simon – life imprisonment
 Willi Zwiener – 25 years' imprisonment
 Arthur Andrä – 20 years' imprisonment
 Oskar Helbig – 20 years' imprisonment
 Richard Walenta – 20 years' imprisonment
 Heinrich Detmers – 7 years' imprisonment
 Walter Ulbricht – 5 years' imprisonment
 Paul Maischein – 5 years' imprisonment
 Josef Fuchsloch – Acquitted
 Kurt Heinrich – Acquitted
 Georg Rickhey – Acquitted
 Heinrich Schmidt – Acquitted

The Belsen Trial

 Josef Kramer – Guilty, sentenced to death
 Irma Grese – Guilty, sentenced to death
 Elisabeth Volkenrath – Guilty, sentenced to death
 Juana Bormann – Guilty, sentenced to death
 Fritz Klein – Guilty, sentenced to death
 For information about nine other Germans who were executed for their war crimes at Belsen, see Belsen Trial.

The Neuengamme Trials
 Max Pauly – Guilty, sentenced to death
 SS Dr Bruno Kitt – Guilty, sentenced to death
 Anton Thumann – Guilty, sentenced to death
 Johann Reese  – Guilty, sentenced to death
 Willy Warnke  – Guilty, sentenced to death
 SS Dr Alfred Trzebinski – Guilty, sentenced to death
 Heinrich Ruge – Guilty, sentenced to death
 Wilhem Bahr – Guilty, sentenced to death
 Andreas Brems – Guilty, sentenced to death
 Wilhelm Dreimann – Guilty, sentenced to death
 Adolf Speck – Guilty, sentenced to death
 Karl Totzauer – Guilty, sentenced to 20 years' imprisonment
 Karl Wiedemann – Guilty, sentenced to 15 years' imprisonment
 Walter Kümmel – Guilty, sentenced to 10 years' imprisonment

Bucharest People’s Tribunal

 Gheoghe Alexianu – Guilty, sentenced to death
 Ion Antonescu – Guilty, sentenced to death. Carried out June 1, 1946
 Mihai Antonescu – Guilty, sentenced to death. Carried out June 1, 1946
 Constantin Vasiliu – Guilty, sentenced to death

International Military Tribunal for the Far East
 (trials held in Tokyo)
 Sadao Araki – Guilty, sentenced to life imprisonment (released in 1955)
 Kenji Doihara – Guilty, sentenced to death
 Kingoro Hashimoto – Guilty, sentenced to life imprisonment (released in 1955)
 Shunroku Hata – Guilty, sentenced to life imprisonment (released in 1955)
 Kiichirō Hiranuma – Guilty, sentenced to life imprisonment (released in 1955)
 Kōki Hirota – Guilty, sentenced to death
 Naoki Hoshino – Guilty, sentenced to life imprisonment (released in 1955)
 Seishirō Itagaki – Guilty, sentenced to death
 Okinori Kaya – Guilty, sentenced to life imprisonment (released in 1955)
 Kōichi Kido – Guilty, sentenced to life imprisonment (released in 1955)
 Heitarō Kimura – Guilty, sentenced to death
 Kuniaki Koiso – Guilty, sentenced to life imprisonment (died in prison in 1950)
 Iwane Matsui – Guilty, sentenced to death
 Yōsuke Matsuoka – Died of natural causes during the course of the trial
 Jirō Minami – Guilty, sentenced to life imprisonment (released in 1955)
 Akira Mutō – Guilty, sentenced to death
 Osami Nagano – Died of natural causes during the course of the trial
 Takazumi Oka – Guilty, sentenced to life imprisonment (released in 1955)
 Shūmei Ōkawa – Ruled unfit to stand trial after suffering from mental illness
 Hiroshi Ōshima – Guilty, sentenced to life imprisonment (released in 1955)
 Kenryō Satō – Guilty, sentenced to life imprisonment (released in 1955)
 Mamoru Shigemitsu – Guilty, sentenced to seven years' imprisonment (released in 1950)
 Shigetarō Shimada – Guilty, sentenced to life imprisonment (released in 1955)
 Toshio Shiratori – Guilty, sentenced to life imprisonment (died in prison in 1949)
 Teiichi Suzuki – Guilty, sentenced to life imprisonment (released in 1955)
 Shigenori Tōgō – Guilty, sentenced to 20 years' imprisonment (died in prison in 1949)
 Hideki Tōjō – Guilty, sentenced to death
 Yoshijirō Umezu – Guilty, sentenced to life imprisonment (released in 1955)

Other trials were held at various locations in the Far East by the United States in the Philippines, Australia, China, the United Kingdom, and other Allied countries. In all, a total of 920 Japanese military personnel and civilians were executed following World War II.

Khabarovsk War Crime Trials

 Mitomo Kazuo – Guilty, sentenced to 15 years' imprisonment
 Kawashima Kiyoshi – Guilty, sentenced to 25 years' imprisonment
 Onoue Masao – Guilty, sentenced to 12 years' imprisonment
 Kikuchi Norimitsu – Guilty, sentenced to two years' imprisonment
 Otozō Yamada – Guilty, sentenced to 25 years' imprisonment
 Kajitsuka Ryuji – Guilty, sentenced to 25 years' imprisonment
 Sato Shunji – Guilty, sentenced to 20 years' imprisonment
 Takahashi Takaatsu – Guilty, sentenced to 25 years' imprisonment
 Karasawa Tomio – Guilty, sentenced to 18 years' imprisonment
 Nishi Toshihide – Guilty, sentenced to 20 years' imprisonment
 Kurushima Yuji – Guilty, sentenced to three years' imprisonment
 Hirazakura Zensaku – Guilty, sentenced to 20 years' imprisonment

Others

Austrian
 Hermine Braunsteiner – A female camp guard at both Ravensbrück and Majdanek, she was sentenced in Graz to three years imprisonment on April 7, 1948 for her crimes in Ravensbruck and released in April 1950. She was later extradited from the United States to West Germany in 1973 for her crimes in Majdanek. Sentenced to life imprisonment on June 30, 1981, she was released in 1996 due to poor health.
 Amon Goeth – The commandant of the Kraków-Płaszów concentration camp, he was sentenced to death on September 5, 1946 and executed by hanging in Kraków on September 13, 1946.
 Konstantin Kammerhofer – The Higher SS and Police Leader in Croatia, he was convicted of war crimes in absentia by Yugoslavia but was never extradited by Germany.
 Richard Kaaserer  – The SS and Police Leader in Sandžak and in Central Norway. Involved in Operation Kopaonik, he was sentenced to death on December 22, 1946 and executed by hanging in Belgrade on January 24, 1947. 
 August Meyszner – The Higher SS and Police Leader in German-occupied Serbia, he was sentenced to death on December 22, 1946 and executed by hanging in Belgrade on January 24, 1947.
 Friedrich Rainer – The Gauleiter of Salzburg and Carinthia, he was also the Chief of Civil Administration of Upper Carniola in Slovenia. Sentenced to death by hanging in Ljubljana in July 1947, he was reportedly executed in November 1950.
 Hanns Albin Rauter – The Higher SS and Police Leader in the Netherlands, he was sentenced to death on May 4, 1948 at The Hague and executed  by firing squad on March 25, 1949. 
 Walter Reder – A Sturmbannführer in the Waffen-SS, he led the Marzabotto massacre. Sentenced to life imprisonment by an Italian military court in October 1951, he was paroled in January 1985.
 Siegfried Seidl – The commandant of the Theresienstadt concentration camp, he was sentenced to death in Vienna on November 14, 1946 and executed by hanging on February 4, 1947.
Franz Stangl, commandant at Treblinka and Sobibor

Croatian
 1986 trial of Andrija Artuković
 1945 Trial of Mile Budak: Mile Budak and others
 1998–1999 trial of Dinko Šakić

Danish
 Søren Kam – (1921–2015) Member of the Nazi Party of Denmark, who fled from Denmark to Germany after the war, and later became a German citizen. On September 21, 2006, Kam was detained in the German town of Kempten im Allgäu. He was wanted in Denmark for the assassination of Danish newspaper editor Carl Henrik Clemmensen in Copenhagen in August 1943.

Dutch
 Pieter Menten, sentenced to 10 years in prison and fined 100,000 guilders for war crimes in 1980, released in 1986, died 1987.

Important Dutch collaborators sentenced by the special tribunals in The Netherlands in connection with the Second World War.
There have been 14,562 convictions pronounced by the special tribunals, and 49,920 sentences by courts.  The special tribunals sentenced in more than 10,000 cases to prison sentences of 3 years or more, and in 152 cases condemned the guilty persons to death, many of which were commuted to life sentences or less. The other courts decided in 30,784 cases on internment of 1 up to 10 years and in 38,984 cases on forfeit of certain civil rights.

French
 Philippe Pétain - Sentenced to death, later commuted to life in prison, died in 1951
 Pierre Laval - Sentenced to death and executed in 1945

German
 Otto Abetz – Sentenced to 20 years' imprisonment in 1949, appealed in 1952, released in 1954
 Richard Baer – Sturmbannführer, commander of the Auschwitz I concentration camp. Lived under the pseudonym of Karl Neumann after the War. Then discovered in 1960 and arrested.
 Klaus Barbie – Sentenced to life imprisonment in 1987, died after serving four years' imprisonment
 Heinz Barth – Convicted in 1983 for his involvement in the Oradour-sur-Glane massacre; released in 1997; died in 2007
 Rudolf Batz – Lived for 15½ years after the war under assumed identity; captured at Bielefeld in November 1960; hanged himself in prison before trial
 Alois Brunner – Escaped, worked for the Gehlen Organization
 Friedrich Christiansen – Arrested, tried and convicted of war crimes and sentenced in 1948 to 12 years' imprisonment in Arnhem; Released prematurely in December 1951 on grounds of ill health; Died in Aukrug, Germany on December 3, 1972.
 Kurt Christmann – SS-Obersturmbannführer and commander of Einsatzkommando 10a in Krasnodar, Russia; Arrested, tried and convicted under Article 6 of the IMT Statute (Crimes Against Humanity) and sentenced to 10 years' imprisonment on December 19, 1980; Died on April 4, 1987.
 Luise Danz – Female guard at various concentration camps, including Plaszów, Majdanek, Auschwitz-Birkenau, and Malchow. Danz was brought to trial in 1996, but the charges were dismissed due to her advanced age and unfitness to stand trial
 Anton Dostler – Executed by an American firing squad in Italy on  December 1, 1945
 Adolf Eichmann – Lived for years in Argentina, captured by Israeli agents in 1960, convicted of high crimes against the Jewish nation and humanity, in Israel, and executed on June 1, 1962.
 Albert Forster - Gauleiter of Danzig-West Prussia, he was sentenced to death in Poland in 1948 and hanged in Warsaw on February 28, 1952. 
 Karl Hermann Frank - A Sudeten German, he was the Higher SS and Police Leader in the Protectorate of Bohemia-Moravia and oversaw the Lidice massacre. Sentenced to death in Czechoslovakia, he was hanged May 22, 1946 in Prague.
 Karl Frenzel – An Oberscharführer who served at Sobibór extermination camp. Frenzel aided in the implementation of the Final Solution, taking part in the industrial-scale extermination of thousands of prisoners as part of Operation Reinhard. Sentenced to life imprisonment in 1966 but released in 1982 due to his ill health.
 Arthur Greiser - Gauleiter of Wartheland, he was sentenced to death for genocide in Poland and hanged in Poznań on July 21, 1946.
 Friedrich Hildebrandt - Gauleiter of Mecklenburg, he was sentenced to death by the U.S. military for issuing orders to shoot parachuting U.S. airmen, and was hanged in Landsberg prison on November 5, 1948.
 Friedrich Jeckeln - The Higher SS and Police Leader in Southern Russia and then in the Baltics, he was sentenced to death in the Riga Trial on February 3, 1946 and executed by hanging the same day.
 Herbert Kappler – Sentenced by Italy to life imprisonment in 1947. Escaped from prison in 1977, then died in 1978
 Fritz Knochlein – Responsible for Le Paradis massacre in 1940, tried, convicted, and hanged by the forces of the United Kingdom in 1949.
 Erich Koch - The Gauleiter of East Prussia and Reichskommissar in Ostland and in Ukraine. He was sentenced to death in March 1959 in Poland but this was commuted to life imprisonment, and he died November 12, 1986.
 Kurt Meyer – Sentenced to death by a Canadian military court, later reduced to life imprisonment, then to 14 years' imprisonment, served 10 years.
 Martin Mutschmann - Gauleiter of Saxony, he was sentenced to death in the Soviet Union in January 1947 and  executed by firing squad in Moscow on February 14, 1947.
 Emanuel Schäfer – Sentenced to six-and-a-half years' imprisonment, but died 1974
 Walter Schmitt – Chief of the SS Personnel Main Office, he was sentenced to death in Czechoslovakia and hanged in Dablice, Prague on September 18, 1945.
 Willy Tensfeld – SS and Police Leader "Oberitalien-West," he was charged with war crimes against Italian partisans. Acquitted by a British military tribunal in April 1947.
 Robert Heinrich Wagner - Gauleiter of Baden and Chief of Civil Administration in Alsace, he was known as the "Butcher of Alsace." Sentenced to death in France in May 1946, he was executed by firing squad on August 14, 1946.

Hungarian
 László Bárdossy – Prime Minister of Hungary from April 1941 to March 1942. Sentenced to death.
 László Deák - Hungarian Colonel involved in the Novi Sad massacre. Later a Waffen-SS Colonel. Sentenced to death.
 Ferenc Feketehalmy-Czeydner - Hungarian General commanded the Novi Sad massacre. Later a Waffen-SS General. Deputy Minister of Defense under Szálasi. Sentenced to death.
 József Grassy - Hungarian General involved in the Novi Sad massacre. Later a Waffen-SS General. Sentenced to death. 
 Béla Imrédy – Prime Minister of Hungary 1938–1939. Sentenced to death.
 Károly Beregfy - Hungarian General and Minister of Defense under Szálasi. Sentenced to death.
 Ferenc Szombathelyi - Hungarian Chief of the General Staff September 1941 to April 1944. Sentenced to death. 
 Ferenc Szálasi – Arrow Cross Party government Prime Minister of Hungary from October 1944 to March 1945. Sentenced to death.
 Döme Sztójay – Prime Minister of Hungary from March to August 1944. Sentenced to death.
 Gábor Vajna - Interior Minister under Szálasi. Sentenced to death.
 Márton Zöldi - Hungarian gendarmerie commander involved in the Novi Sad massacre. Sentenced to death.

Italian
 Nicola Bellomo – sentenced to death by firing squad and executed on 11 September 1945.
 Pietro Caruso – sentenced to death by firing squad and executed on 22 September 1944.
 Guido Buffarini Guidi – executed 10 July 1945.
 Pietro Koch –  sentenced to execution by firing squad, sentence carried out 4 June 1945.

Japanese
 Masaharu Homma – convicted of war crimes, sentenced to death, then executed on April 3, 1946.
 Hitoshi Imamura – sentenced to imprisonment for ten years.
 Kiyotake Kawaguchi – imprisoned from 1946 to 1953.
 Tomoyuki Yamashita – executed on February 23, 1946.

Latvian
 Konrāds Kalējs – Immigrated to Australia in 1950; moved to the United States in 1959; deported from the United States to Australia in 1994; fled from Australia to Canada in 1995; deported from Canada 1997; moved to England; and then to Australia. Died in Australia in 2001. A member of the Arajs Kommando.
 Boļeslavs Makovskis – Fled from the United States to West Germany in 1987; put on trial in 1990; his trial was quashed.
 Elmārs Sproģis – Exonerated in 1984.

Lithuanian
 Vladas Zajanckauskas – In 2005 at the age 89, his U.S. citizenship was ordered revoked in 2007. He was ordered to be deported.

See also

 Épuration légale
 List of Most Wanted Nazi War Criminals according to the Simon Wiesenthal Center
 The Ravensbrück trials of the camp officials from the Ravensbrück concentration camp.
 War-responsibility trials in Finland – a series of trials of the Finnish leadership, originally established for war crimes but held without war crime indictments

References

External links
 Deported War Criminals

Axis
Japanese war crimes
Indicted
Axis